Rottigawad is a village in Dharwad district of Karnataka, India.

Famous places: dyamamma temple

Dyamama lake

Demographics 
As of the 2011 Census of India there were 554 households in Rottigawad and a total population of 2,494 consisting of 1,272 males and 1,222 females. There were 265 children ages 0-6.

References

 Villages in Dharwad district